The 2010–11 Buffalo Bulls men's basketball team represented the University at Buffalo during the 2010–11 NCAA Division I men's basketball season. The Bulls, led by twelfth-year head coach Reggie Witherspoon, played their home games at Alumni Arena in Amherst, New York as members of the Mid-American Conference (MAC). They finished the season 20–14, 8–8 in MAC play to finish in sixth place in the MAC East. It was the third 20-win season in the school's NCAA Division I history and the second in their past three seasons.

Buffalo hosted unanimous national college player of the year Jimmer Fredette and the 16th-ranked BYU Cougars at Alumni Arena on December 30, 2010. The Bulls held Fredette to 6 points on 1-of-9 shooting in the first half but Fredette managed 28 points in the second half for a season-high total of 34; BYU ultimately won 90–82. After the game, Reggie Witherspoon said that Fredette was indisputably the best college basketball player ever to play a game in Western New York.

Despite an exit in the quarterfinals of the MAC men's basketball tournament, Buffalo received an invitation to the CollegeInsider.com Postseason Tournament (CIT). It was the school's third Division I postseason appearance and first since the 2009 College Basketball Invitational. In the CIT, Buffalo won its first two games before losing in the quarterfinals against eventual runner-up Iona.

The 2010–11 season featured the college debut of Javon McCrea. At the end of the season, McCrea would be the first Buffalo player named the MAC Freshman of the Year. McCrea would go on to become the program's all-time leading scorer.

Previous season
The previous year's Bulls finished the 2009–10 season with an overall record of 18–12 and a record of 9–7 in conference play. It was just their second consecutive season with a winning record. In spite of that, they lost in the second round of the 2010 MAC tournament. Buffalo graduated its top five scorers from this team.  Senior guard Byron Mulkey redshirted in 2009–10 due to the logjam of seniors at the guard position and the need for senior leadership on the 2010–11 team.

Departures

Roster

Schedule

|-
!colspan=6 style=| Regular season

|-
!colspan=6 style=| 2011 MAC Men's Basketball Tournament

|-
!colspan=6 style=| 2011 CollegeInsider.com Postseason Tournament

Awards

Freshman of the Year
Javon McCrea – 2011

Academic All-MAC
Byron Mulkey – 2011

All-MAC Second Team
Byron Mulkey – 2011

MAC All-Freshman Team
Javon McCrea – 2011

References

Buffalo Bulls men's basketball seasons
Buffalo
Buffalo Bulls men's basketball
Buffalo Bulls men's basketball
Buffalo